The Court of Appeal of the High Court of Hong Kong is the second most senior court in the Hong Kong legal system. It deals with appeals on all civil and criminal cases from the Court of First Instance and the District Court. It is one of two courts that makes up the High Court of Hong Kong (which was formerly known as the Supreme Court of Hong Kong). Sometimes criminal appeals from Magistrates' Courts with general public importance are also dealt with in the Court of Appeal, either by referral by a single judge from the Court of First Instance, or upon granting of leave on application for review by the Secretary for Justice.

This court also hears appeals from the Lands Tribunal and various tribunals and statutory bodies.

The Chief Judge of the High Court of Hong Kong serves as the President of the Court of Appeal.

Prior to the establishment of the Court of Appeal in 1976, a Full Court consisting of first instance High Court judges was constituted to hear appeals.

Cases in the Court of Appeal are decided by a bench consisting of one, two or three Judges. On rare occasions, having regard to the public importance of the issue, the Court of Appeal has been constituted by a division of five Judges. Final substantive appeal hearings take place before a bench of three Judges. In civil cases, interlocutory appeals and leave to appeal application hearings take place before a bench of two Judges. A single Judge can grant leave to appeal on a paper application and make procedural orders/directions not involving the determination of an appeal. In criminal cases, appeals against sentence take place before a bench of two Judges and leave to appeal application hearings take place before a single Judge. A decision by a two-member bench of the Court of Appeal has the same binding precedential value as a decision by a three-member bench of the Court of Appeal or a five-member bench of the Court of Appeal. If a case is heard by a two-member bench and the two Judges differ on the outcome, then the lower court's judgment or order will not be disturbed. In such a situation, any party can apply for the case to be re-heard by an uneven number of Judges in the Court of Appeal.

A Judge of the Court of First Instance may also sit as a Judge in the Court of Appeal, including as a single Judge (for example, when determining applications for leave to appeal in criminal cases).

Cases 
In August 2022, the court ruled that same-sex marriages overseas would not be recognized as valid in Hong Kong, resulting in no rights or benefits given to married couples in Hong Kong.

In November 2022, the court ruled that there are minimum jail sentences for "serious" national security offenses.

List of Justices of Appeal

See also
 Vice Presidents of the Court of Appeal of Hong Kong
 High Court of Hong Kong
 Judiciary of Hong Kong
 Appellate court

References

External links
 Hong Kong Judiciary website, High Court page

Hong Kong
 
1997 establishments in Hong Kong
Courts and tribunals established in 1997